The Magrath Baronetcy, of Allevolan in the County of Tipperary, was a title in the Baronetage of Ireland.  It was created on 5 June 1629 for John Magrath.  The title became extinct on the death of the third Baronet in circa 1670.

Magrath baronets, of Allevolan (1629)
Sir John Magrath, 1st Baronet (died )
Sir Terence Magrath, 2nd Baronet (died )
Sir John Magrath, 3rd Baronet (died c. 1670)

References

Extinct baronetcies in the Baronetage of Ireland